The following is a non-exhaustive list of railways operating in Algeria with opening dates if available. The classifications of railways into long-distance and regional railways correspond to SNTF categories.

Northern Algeria

Long-distance lines 
 Algiers-Oran line (1871)
 Algiers-Skikda line (1886)
 Ramdane Djamel-Annaba line (1904)

Regional lines 
 Béni Mansour-Bejaïa line (1889)
 Bordj Bou Arreridj-M'Sila line (2010)
 Tabia-Akid Abbes line (1916)
 Akid Abbes-Ghazaouet line (1936)
 Es Sénia-Béni Saf line (1885; rebuilt 1985–2015)
 Thénia-Oued Aissi line (1888; rebuilt 2010)
 Ramdane Djamel-Jijel line (1990)
 Inactive since 26/12/1996: Mohammadia-Mostaganem line (1879; rebuilt 1908)

Vertical (north-south) lines

Long-distance lines 
 Annaba-Djebel Onk line (1888; rebuilt 1966)
 Oued Tlelat-Béchar line (1906; rebuilt 2010)
 El Guerrah-Touggourt line (1914)
 Inactive, Mohammadia-Saïda-El Biod line

High Plateaux lines

Regional lines 
 Ain M'lila-El Aouinet line (2009)
 Ain Touta-M'Sila line (2009)
 Souk Ahras-Tunisia line

Commuter rail

Algiers Province 
 Birtouta-Zéralda line

Oran Province 
 Oran-Arzew line

Constantine Province
 Constantine-Zighout Youcef line
 Constantine-El Khroub line

 
Railway lines
Algeria